The curling competition at the 2019 Winter Deaflympics was held between 11 and 20 December 2019 at the Circolo Sciatori, Madesimo. The ICSD committee decided to increase the maximum number of teams for both genders from ten to twelve. This was the first curling competition to be held as a part of multi-sport event in Italy since the country last hosted the curling event as a part of the 2013 Winter Universiade.

Competition schedule 
Curling competition started the day before the 2019 Winter Deaflympics opening ceremony and finished on the last day of the games, meaning the sport was the only one to have a competition every day of the games.

Participating nations 
Men and women each representing 12 different nations are scheduled to take part in the curling competition.

Men

Round-robin

Knockout

Women

Round-robin

Knockout

Medal table

Medal summary

References 

2019 in curling
International curling competitions hosted by Italy
2019 Winter Deaflympics events